Trofimovka is a rural locality (a village) in Lavrovskoye Rural Settlement, Sudogodsky District, Vladimir Oblast, Russia. The population was 11 as of 2010.

Geography 
Trofimovka is located on the Klyazma River, 31 km north of Sudogda (the district's administrative centre) by road. Kiselnitsa is the nearest rural locality.

References 

Rural localities in Sudogodsky District